Goggia essexi, also known commonly as  Essex's dwarf leaf-toed gecko, Essex's leaf-toed gecko, and Essex's pygmy gecko,  is a species of gecko, a lizard in the family Gekkonidae. The species is endemic to South Africa.

Etymology
The specific name, essexi, is in honor of South African herpetologist Robert Essex.

Geographic range
G. essexi is found in Eastern Cape province, South Africa.

Habitat
The preferred natural habitat of G. essexi is rocky areas in shrubland.

Description
G. essexi is very small for its genus.

Reproduction
G. essexi is oviparous. Sexually mature females lay eggs in a communal site under a rock.

References

Further reading
Bauer AM, Good DA, Branch WR (1997). "The taxonomy of the southern African leaf-toed geckos (Squamata: Gekkonidae), with a review of Old World Phyllodactylus and the description of five new genera". Proceedings of the California Academy of Siences 49 (14): 447–497. (Goggia essexi, new combination, p. 470).
Branch WR, Bauer AM, Good DA (1995). "Species limits in the Phyllodactylus lineatus complex (Reptilia: Gekkonidae), with the elevation of two taxa to specific status and the description of two new species". Journal of the Herpetological Association of Africa 44 (2): 33–54. (Phyllodactylus essexi). 
Hewitt J (1925). "On some new species of Reptiles and Amphibians from South Africa". Records of the Albany Museum, Grahamstown 3: 343–370. (Phyllodactylus essexi, new species, p. 343).
Rösler H (2000). "Kommentierte Liste der rezent, subrezent und fossil bekannten Geckotaxa (Reptilia: Gekkonomorpha)". Gekkota 2: 28–153. (Goggia essexi, p. 83). (in German).

Goggia
Reptiles described in 1925
Endemic reptiles of South Africa
Taxa named by John Hewitt (herpetologist)